15 Maiden Lane is a 1936 American crime film directed by Allan Dwan and starring Claire Trevor, Cesar Romero, and Lloyd Nolan. The plot involves an insurance investigator (Trevor) who infiltrates a gang who had stolen jewels from the eponymous building on Maiden Lane in the Fulton Street District of Manhattan.  The neighborhood had been the center of New York City's Diamond District since the 19th century before its gradual relocation uptown to 47th Street after World War II.  The Museum of Modern Art in New York City screened a restored print of the film in June 2013 as part of an Allan Dwan retrospective.

Cast
 Claire Trevor as Jane Martin
 Cesar Romero as Frank Peyton
 Lloyd Nolan as Detective Walsh
 Douglas Fowley as Nick Shelby
 Lester Matthews as Gilbert Lockhart
 Robert McWade as John Graves
 Holmes Herbert as Harold Anderson
 Paul Fix as Agitator

References

External links
 
 

1936 films
1936 crime films
American detective films
American black-and-white films
New York City in fiction
Films directed by Allan Dwan
20th Century Fox films
1930s English-language films
1930s American films